Pizza Patrón Inc. is an American pizza chain headquartered in San Antonio, Texas. It was founded in 1986 by Antonio Swad and Bernadette Fiaschetti. Swad sold Pizza Patrón in 2016 to Charles Loflin, the new CEO. It was formerly headquartered in Dallas.

Pizza Patrón operates locations in Arizona, California, Illinois, and Texas. The chain primarily opens locations in neighborhoods with a high proportion of Latino residents. In addition to the franchise's 100 locations across the southwest United States, 40 more are currently under development.

Brand relaunch
In 2018, Pizza Patron went through a total brand relaunch. With intents of appealing to a younger consumer base, Pizza Patron swayed towards a more modern and youthful look. The transition included several different segments including a logo change. The old ''Patron Man'' logo was revamped into a more simplified version, along with the overall color pallet change to teal/mandarin red. Aside from the visual changes the company underwent, the company’s overall mission statement also has remained the same since the start of the company. Pizza Patron was widely recognized as a Latin culture restaurant, relying heavily on the Latin consumer base. While the brand still celebrates its Latin roots, today Pizza Patron leans towards a much more inclusive “Flavor for All” motto.

Logo and slogan
The brands iconic logo features El Patrón wearing a fedora hat with his dashing mustache. As the Pizza Boss, El Patrón would have no other way. Since 1986 The Patrón Way has been about Real Fresh and Real Flavor, with a Latin Inspired twist on a classic pizza.

Expansion, new menu items
Pizza Patrón decided to expand its online horizons by further touching base with its online presence. With the company’s online ordering becoming more prevalent, an interlacing app was released at the end of March 2020.
On March 23, 2020, Pizza Patron launched its first app ever. The app brings a whole new take to the Patron company. Along with mobile ordering now being available, “Patron Perks” a reward program that uses “Slice Points” offers customers rewards and deals following their visits and restaurants.

On May 3, 2007, the company reported that sales in the first three months of 2007 were up 35% compared to sales during the first three months of 2006. The company attributed the strong growth in sales to publicity generated by news reports about the "Pizza for Pesos" campaign and said that its policy of accepting pesos, originally scheduled to last only until the end of April, was being made permanent.

Founding
Pizza Patrón was founded in 1986 by Antonio Swad, of Lebanese and Italian descent. Swad is also known for founding the Wingstop brand, which was sold in 2003 to focus on growing the Pizza Patrón brand. The brand has since been sold, and Swad is now working on other restaurant ventures. Pizza Patron was also founded by Bernadette Fiaschetti, who is of Italian and Irish descent. Fiaschetti is also known for founding Wingstop. She has since moved on from restaurants, and now hosts a nationally syndicated radio show on iHeartMedia called One Life Radio.

Logo and slogan
The franchise's logo features the face of a man wearing a fedora hat. Their former logo was of the fedora hat alone. The chain's original slogan was "A Good Deal" from 1986 to 2001, and then it was ultimately changed to Más Pizza. Menos Dinero when the company started its franchising opportunities. (Spanish for "More Pizza. Less Money"). In 2017, when the company was sold, the company ultimately changed the slogan to "Pizza Like A Boss", and abandoned the "Más Pizza. Menos Dinero" slogan that was with the company for 16 years.

Pizza por Pesos
In January 2007, Pizza Patrón announced its new "Pizza por Pesos" policy which enabled the chain's customers to pay for pizzas with Mexican pesos for a limited time. Though the company was not the first to implement such a policy in the United States, the move came at a time of increasingly heated debate over illegal immigration in the United States and caused the chain's Dallas headquarters to receive complaints and death threats. It also created publicity for the chain, garnering media attention from several outlets including Fox News, The Colbert Report, MSNBC, The Tonight Show and many more. After the first week of the promotion, one owner reported that customers had paid with about 15,000 Mexican pesos, equivalent to about US$1,400, at his two southern California locations, which accounted for roughly 20% of his profits.

On May 3, 2007, the company reported that sales in the first three months of 2007 were up 35% compared to sales during the first three months of 2006.  The company attributed the strong growth in sales to publicity generated by news reports about the "Pizza for Pesos" campaign and said that its policy of accepting pesos, originally scheduled to last only until the end of April, was being made permanent.

Pizza por Favor
On June 6, 2012, Pizza Patrón launched its "Pizza por Favor" promotion offering a free large pepperoni pizza to any customer who ordered in Spanish, by simply saying "Pizza Por Favor".

The event sparked controversy and criticism from conservative groups. The Conservative Caucus, an organization that advocates for English as the official national language of the United States, criticized “Pizza Por Favor,” and on the day in May when the promotion was announced, Pizza Patrón's email servers were maliciously hacked into.  The company received international news coverage and gave away 80,000 pizzas during the one-day promotion, including 50,000 during the three-hour window it advertised plus another 30,000 in coupons for free pizzas that were given to people still waiting in line after supplies ran out and business hours had ended.

See also
 List of pizza chains of the United States

References

External links

 

Companies based in Dallas
Economy of the Southeastern United States
Economy of the Southwestern United States
Regional restaurant chains in the United States
Pizza chains of the United States
1986 establishments in Texas
Restaurants established in 1986
American companies established in 1986